XHBAC-FM is a radio station on 95.7 FM in Bahía Asunción, Baja California Sur.

History
XEBAC-AM 1100 received its concession on May 8, 1995. It migrated to FM in 2011.

References

Radio stations in Baja California Sur
Radio stations established in 1995